This is a partial, non-exhaustive list of notable online dating websites and mobile apps.
All services in the list that have an entry, whether they support heterosexual connections, currently support homosexual connections.



Online dating services

Defunct sites
SpeedDate.com
Yahoo! Personals
Spoonr
RocknRollDating
Spray Date
True
Matchmaker.com (Dating service founded in 1986 which had  users)

See also
Timeline of online dating services

References

Dating

Online services comparisons
Dating websites